Pritchardia munroi, the Kamalo pritchardia,  is a species of fan palm that is endemic to Hawaii in the United States. It is found in dry forests on the eastern (leeward) side of the island of Molokai. The specific epithet, refers to James Monro, the manager of the Molokai Ranch at the time of its discovery (1920).

References

munroi
Endemic flora of Hawaii
Biota of Molokai
Trees of Hawaii
Plants described in 1920
Taxonomy articles created by Polbot